Robert John Collard (born 1 October 1968) is a British auto racing driver from Hampshire, best known for racing in the British Touring Car Championship, winning two races in a West Surrey Racing MG, and claiming the Independent's Cup title in 2003. In 2008, he returned to running the series full-time, driving for the Motorbase Performance team, where he remained for 2009, before returning to West Surrey Racing. Collard also owns his own demolition firm, R Collard Ltd.

Career
For many years, he raced hot rods, only switching to circuit racing in his late 20s. He raced Formula Ford for 3 years. However, as most drives in Formula 3 and higher went to younger drivers, he turned his attention to saloon based racing, coming 3rd in the Vauxhall SRi V6 championship.

In 2000, the British Touring Car Championship launched Class B, featuring lower-powered but cheaper cars, to fill its relatively thin grid. Rob took up this opportunity, and finished 4th overall in his class. He only raced a partial season in the renamed Production Class in 2001, concentrating on preparing a Renault Clio for a full assault on the Production Class in 2002 with his own Collard Racing team.

The season was a disaster, however. Engine reliability and lasting performance was low, and a victory and a 2nd in the opening meeting proved to be a false dawn, as the small team struggled to get working machinery to the races, and he was outside the championship top 10. He also contested 6 ETCC races in a Nissan Primera for RJN Motorsport that year.

Undeterred, Rob redoubled his efforts for 2003, moving up to the main Touring Class with a Vauxhall Astra. He beat several better-funded teams and drivers to win the Independent's Cup, and finished 10th overall ahead of several 'works' drivers. For 2004, there were less works teams, with MG pulling out and Honda scaling down to only one car. As a result, more competitive cars had independent status. Collard Racing had no realistic hope of matching Anthony Reid's independent MG or Matt Neal's Honda, and finished 6th in the Indy cup and 12th overall.

In 2005, Rob replaced Reid in West Surrey Racing's MG, concentrating purely on racing rather than team ownership. This was his most competitive season to date, with 2 outright wins and 7th place overall. For 2006, he was joined in the team by Colin Turkington under WSR's new guise "Team RAC". This time, he finished 9th overall with a single podium.

Collard's heavy-handed tactics often come under criticism from fellow drivers and teams, as well as numerous fans of the series. It is believed that Rob's racing licence amassed 9 points in the 2006 season, just three short of a ban from racing. Fellow drivers have often spoken out about his lack of driving standards, one going as far as to describe him as a "rock-ape" at a 2006 meeting.

In 2007, Collard had no BTCC drive, instead contesting the early rounds of the Porsche Carrera Cup UK, achieving little success in these big difficult-to-control rear-wheel-drive cars. He contested the final round of the BTCC for GR Asia, and returned full-time in 2008 in a Motorbase BMW. At Croft, he scored their best-ever result in 4th, after he and team-mate Steven Kane ran 3rd and 4th for a while. The team had worked on damper settings before the meeting. For 2009, Collard and Jonathan Adam race Motorbase's BMWs. He won two races early on in 2009 at the opening round at Brands Hatch and at Donington Park. He came close to adding a third at Snetterton, before contact with James Nash saw him spin across the track into the path of Stephen Jelley, resulting in a huge collision. Collard complained of abdominal pain and was taken to hospital, while Nash was excluded from the results. He then suffered another big incident at the next round at Knockhill when he and Matt Neal collided after Matt Neal lost control of car. Blighted by incidents and 'DNFs' through the second half of the season, Rob Collard was unable to match the form of the first half of the season but still ended up 6th in the BTCC drivers championship, his best performance in the BTCC so far.

For 2010, Collard returned to West Surrey Racing, replacing reigning champion Colin Turkington who had failed to raise the necessary budget. He finished the year in 9th place.

Collard remained with WSR for 2011 but failed to register a race win. He finished the year 8th in the Drivers Championship. In 2012, he won 3 races with the team thus finishing 5th overall his best final championship position. In 2013, the team re-signed 2009 champion Colin Turkington. WSR also introduced the new BMW 3 series. Collard achieved a solitary podium and finished up in 13th place overall.

In 2014, Collard again remained with WSR, winning 1 race and finishing 6th in the drivers championship. He remained with the team for 2015, where he won the first race of the season and finished in 10th place in the championship.

For 2020, Collard made his British GT Championship debut for Barwell Motorsport, driving a Lamborghini Huracán GT3 Evo. On 8 November at the season finale the Silverstone 500, Collard and team mate Sandy Mitchell took victory in the race and were confirmed as British GT Champions.

Personal life
Collard's family starred in an episode of Channel 4's Wife Swap, shown during October 2006. He has told ITV's BTCC coverage that his hero was the late Colin McRae, and his ambition is to win the World Touring Car Championship. He is the father of racing driver Ricky Collard.

Collard endorsed the Conservative Party in the 2019 United Kingdom general election.

Racing record

Complete British Touring Car Championship results
(key) Races in bold indicate pole position (1 point awarded – 2000–2002 all races, 2003–present just in first race, 2000–2003 in class). Races in italics indicate fastest lap (1 point awarded – 2001–present all races, 2000–2003 in class) * signifies that driver led race for at least one lap (1 point given – 2003–present all races).

Complete European Touring Car Championship results
(key)

Complete British GT Championship results
(key) (Races in bold indicate pole position in class) (Races in italics indicate fastest lap in class)

References

External links
Official Website
Profile at BTCCPages.com
BTCC-Racing profile

1968 births
Living people
English businesspeople
English racing drivers
Formula Ford drivers
European Touring Car Championship drivers
European Touring Car Cup drivers
British Touring Car Championship drivers
Porsche Carrera Cup GB drivers
Conservative Party (UK) people
British GT Championship drivers
Mini Challenge UK drivers
BMW M drivers
Lamborghini Squadra Corse drivers